Saad Mohammad Jumaa Alayoubi (1916 – 19 August 1979) was a Jordanian politician, writer and poet who served as the 17th Prime Minister of Jordan in 1967.

Biography
Saad Jumaa' was born in Tafilah, Ottoman Empire in 1916 to the prominent family of Alayoubi of Damascene Kurdish origin. 

Jumaa was a writer and thinker. He completed his secondary education in Salt and then studied law at Damascus University and graduated in 1947.

Jumma died on 19 August 1979 in London, United Kingdom.

Career
 Director General of Press and Publications 1948–1949 
 Head of the Political Division, Ministry of Foreign Affairs 1949–1950
 Secretary to the Prime Minister 1950–1954 
 Vice-Minister of Interior
 Mayor of Amman 1954–1958
 Vice-Minister of Foreign Affairs 1958–1959
 Ambassador to Iran then Syria 1959–1962
 Ambassador to the United States of America 1962–1965
 The Chief of the Royal Hashemite Court 1965 
 Prime Minister and Defence Minister 1967
 Member of the Senates 1967–1969
 Ambassador at Ministry of Foreign Affairs 1969
 Ambassador to the United Kingdom 1969–1970

Honours
 : Honorary Commander of the Order of the Defender of the Realm (1965).
:First class of the Order of Homayoun.
: Chinese First Class Medal.
: Order of Merit of the Italian Republic -1st Class / Knight Grand Cross.
: Order of the Star of Jordan.

Publications
 (Society of hatred), Arab Publisher House, Arabic, 1971
 (God or destruction), Arabic
 (The conspiracy and battle of fate), Arab Publisher House, Arabic, 1968.
 (The sons of snakes), Arabic

See also
 List of prime ministers of Jordan

References

External links
 Prime Ministry of Jordan website

1916 births
1979 deaths
Prime Ministers of Jordan
Damascus University alumni
Ambassadors of Jordan to Syria
Ambassadors of Jordan to Iran
Ambassadors of Jordan to the United States
Ambassadors of Jordan to the United Kingdom
Jordanian diplomats
Jordanian writers
Members of the Senate of Jordan
Defence ministers of Jordan